The Saudi Arabian textbook controversy refers to criticism of the content of school textbooks in Saudi Arabia following the September 11 attacks.

Following the attacks, and the revelation that the leader of the organization (Osama bin Laden) and 15 of the 19 hijackers involved in the attacks, were Saudis, concern was expressed in the U.S. over "what role" the Saudi educational system "played in shaping the beliefs of Osama bin Laden's followers".  Among the passages found in one 10th-grade Saudi textbook on Monotheism included: "The Hour will not come until Muslims will fight the Jews, and Muslims will kill all the Jews."  Another work (M. H. Shakir's translation of the Holy Qur'an) in a discussion of the early Muslims attacks on the Ibn Nadhir tribe, stated: "It's allowed to demolish, burn or destroy the bastions of the Kuffar (infidels)- and all what constitutes their shield from Muslims if that was for the sake of victory for the Muslims and the defeat for the Kuffar".

The American government called on Saudi Arabia to reform its educational curriculum, including textbooks in Saudi schools and distributed worldwide, by reviewing and revising educational materials and eliminating any that spread "intolerance and hatred" towards Christians and Jews and promoted holy war against "unbelievers."

Some Saudis vigorously opposed changes. Saleh Al-Fawzan, the author of the textbook on monotheism and "one of the staunchest religious conservatives in the education system", wrote in a February 11, 2002 article in the Saudi newspaper Al Jazeera:

"The Jews and Christians and the polytheists have shown their heartfelt hatred and try to prevent us from the true path of God. They want to change our religion and our teaching to disconnect us from Islam so they can come and occupy us with their armies. It is bad enough when it comes from the infidels, but worse when they are of our skin. They say we create parrots, but they are the real parrots repeating what our enemies say of Islam."

By 2006, Senior Saudi officials assured the United States that the reform was completed, but an investigation of twelve Saudi Ministry of Education religion textbooks by the human-rights group Freedom House suggested otherwise. Saudi officials have tried to convince Washington that the educational curriculum has been reformed. On a speaking tour of American cities, the Saudi ambassador to the United States, Prince Turki bin Faisal, told audiences that the Kingdom has eliminated what might be perceived as intolerance from its old textbooks.

In November 2010, the BBC's investigative program Panorama reported that Saudi national textbooks advocating anti-Semitism and violence against homosexuals were still in use in weekend religious programs in the United Kingdom.

In October 2012, Robert Bernstein, who founded Human Rights Watch, serves as a chairman of Advancing Human Rights, and was a former chairman and CEO of Random House, and various other book publishers, expressed their "profound disappointment that the Saudi government continues to print textbooks inciting hatred and violence against religious minorities."  They gave an example of an 8th grade textbook which writes, "The Apes are the people of the Sabbath, the Jews; and the Swine are the infidels of the communion of Jesus, the Christians."  The publishers explained that "hate speech is the precursor to genocide. First you get to hate and then you kill."

According to the Anti-Defamation League’s November 2018 report, Saudi government-published school textbooks for the 2018-19 academic year promoting incitement to hatred or violence against Jews, Christians, women, and homosexual men, despite the kingdom’s claims to the contrary. One of the examples read, “The hour will not come until Muslims fight the Jews, so that the Muslims kill them, until the Jew hides behind rock and tree, so the rock or the tree says: ‘Oh Muslim, oh servant of God, this Jew is behind me, so kill him.’” Another passage also suggested that “beating [women] is permitted when necessary.”

See also
Bias in education
Textbooks in Israel
Textbooks in the Israeli–Palestinian conflict
Pakistan studies/Pakistani textbooks controversy
Institute for Monitoring Peace and Cultural Tolerance in School Education

References

External links 
 Saudi Arabia's Curriculum Of Intolerance: With Excerpts from Saudi Ministry of Education Textbooks for Islamic Studies, Institute for Gulf Affairs
 Does Saudi Preach Intolerance? An Independent Study
 Saudi mother on what her kids learned at school

Education controversies in Saudi Arabia
Textbook controversies
Textbooks in the Middle East
Antisemitism in Saudi Arabia